James Heath Terry  (born March 16, 1981) is an American mixed martial artist currently competing in the Welterweight division of Bellator MMA. A professional competitor since 2006, he formerly competed for Strikeforce. He also works as an instructor and personal trainer at Cung Le's gym and The Quad, and is a co-captain of the USH Fight Team.

Background
Terry was born in Kodiak, Alaska but later moved to Arizona. Terry excelled in wrestling and originally attended Canyon del Oro High School but was kicked off the team for poor decisions inside the classroom and as an athlete. This led to Terry's subsequent transfer to Sunnyside High School where he was a four-year letterman and captain in his junior and senior seasons, and also earned All-State honors three times as well as All-City twice. Terry continued his career at Pima Community College where he was an NJCAA All-American, finishing third nationally and winning an individual regional championship while his team as a whole also won the regional championship. Terry later transferred to Arizona State University and wrestled in their Division I program.

Mixed martial arts career

Early career
In 2005, Terry moved to California, where he trained in kickboxing with Cung Le. Terry made his professional debut in 2006 as a Welterweight and compiled an undefeated record of 5-0 before being handed his first professional loss at the hands of Jeremiah Metcalf. Terry was then signed by Strikeforce.

Strikeforce
Terry made his promotional debut at Strikeforce: Shamrock vs. Diaz on April 11, 2009 against Zak Bucia and won via unanimous decision. They had a rematch months later at Strikeforce: Carano vs. Cyborg on August 15, 2009 and Terry won again, this time via TKO in the first round. 

Terry made his next appearance for the promotion against future Strikeforce Welterweight Champion Tarec Saffiedine at Strikeforce Challengers: Kaufman vs. Hashi on February 26, 2010 and lost via unanimous decision. Terry next fought David Marshall at Strikeforce: Diaz vs. Noons II on October 9, 2010 and won via unanimous decision. He then fought at Strikeforce: Diaz vs. Cyborg on January 29, 2011 against Lucas Gamaza and won via TKO in the first round. Terry followed this up with another first-round knockout win against Josh Thornburg at Strikeforce Challengers: Wilcox vs. Damm on April 1, 2011. 

Terry then faced Caros Fodor in the main event at Strikeforce Challengers: Fodor vs. Terry on June 24, 2011 and lost via unanimous decision, snapping a three-fight winning streak. Terry then fought at Strikeforce Challengers: Larkin vs. Rossborough on September 23, 2011 against Magno Almeida and won via knockout in the first round. 

Terry made his next appearance at Strikeforce: Rockhold vs. Jardine on January 7, 2012 against Nah-Shon Burrell. Terry lost in a controversial split decision, and later criticized the judging. 

Terry then faced former King of the Cage Junior Welterweight Champion Bobby Green at Strikeforce: Barnett vs. Cormier on May 19, 2012. Terry again lost via split decision.

Bellator MMA
Terry made his Bellator debut on April 4, 2014, facing Rick Reeves at Bellator 115. He lost via split decision.

Terry faced André Santos on October 17, 2014 at Bellator 129. He lost the fight via unanimous decision.

Terry faced Carlos Eduardo Rocha on September 19, 2015 at Bellator 142: Dynamite 1. He won via TKO in the first round.

Terry faced  Nick Barnes on December 4, 2015 at Bellator 147. He lost the fight via submission in the first round.

Terry faced Adam Piccolotti on September 29, 2018 at Bellator at Bellator 206. He lost the fight via unanimous decision.

Mixed martial arts record

|-
| Loss
|align=center| 20–11
| Batsumberel Dagvadorj
| Submission (bulldog choke)
|Bellator 226
| 
|align=center| 1
|align=center| 2:43
|San Jose, California United States
|
|-
| Loss
|align=center| 20–10
| Adam Piccolotti
| Decision (unanimous)
|Bellator 206
| 
|align=center| 3
|align=center| 5:00
|San Jose, California United States
|
|-
| Win
|align=center| 20–9 
| Don Mohammed
| Decision (unanimous)
|Bellator 199
| 
|align=center| 3
|align=center| 5:00
|San Jose, California United States
|Catchweight (165 lbs) bout.
|-
| Win
|align=center| 19–9 
| JC Llamas
| Decision (technical)
|Bellator 172
| 
|align=center| 3
|align=center| 0:37
|San Jose, California United States
| 
|-
| Win
|align=center| 18–9
| Justin Baesman
| Decision (unanimous)
|Bellator 165
| 
|align=center| 3
|align=center| 5:00
|San Jose, California United States
| 
|-
| Win
|align=center| 17–9
| Buddy Wallace
| Decision (unanimous)
| Conquer Fighting Championships 2
| 
|align=center| 3
|align=center| 5:00
|  Richmond, California United States
| 
|-
| Loss
|align=center| 16–9
| Nick Barnes
| Submission (rear-naked choke)
| Bellator 147
| 
|align=center| 1
|align=center| 2:48
|  San Jose, California United States
|Catchweight (175 lbs) bout.
|-
| Win
|align=center| 16–8
| Carlos Eduardo Rocha
| TKO (punches)
| Bellator 142: Dynamite 1
| 
|align=center| 1
|align=center| 4:00
|  San Jose, California United States
| 
|-
| Win
| align=center| 15–8
| Chris Herrera
| TKO (punches)
| DH: Dragon House 20
| 
| align=center| 1
| align=center| 0:33
| San Francisco, California, United States
| 
|-
| Loss
| align=center| 14–8
| André Santos
| Decision (unanimous)
| Bellator 129
| 
| align=center| 3
| align=center| 5:00
| Council Bluffs, Iowa, United States
| 
|-
| Win
| align=center| 14–7
| Daniel McWilliams
| TKO (punches)
| 408 Fights: Battle of the Bay 3
| 
| align=center| 1
| align=center| N/A
| San Jose, California, United States
| 
|-
| Loss
| align=center| 13–7
| Rick Reeves
| Decision (split)
| Bellator 115
| 
| align=center| 3
| align=center| 5:00
| Reno, Nevada, United States
| 
|-
| Win
| align=center| 13–6
| Sam Liera
| TKO (punches)
| Arise Fighting Championships 
| 
| align=center| 3
| align=center| 2:26
| Santa Clara, California, United States
| 
|-
| Win
| align=center| 12–6
| Marcus Gaines
| TKO (punches)
| Dragon House MMA 15 
| 
| align=center| 1
| align=center| 0:12
| San Francisco, California, United States
|Return to Welterweight.
|-
| Loss
| align=center| 11–6
| Mike de la Torre
| Submission (rear-naked choke)
| Arise Fighting Championships 
| 
| align=center| 1
| align=center| 0:57
| Santa Clara, California, United States
| 
|-
| Loss
| align=center| 11–5
| Bobby Green
| Decision (split)
| Strikeforce: Barnett vs. Cormier
| 
| align=center| 3
| align=center| 5:00
| San Jose, California, United States
| 
|-
| Loss
| align=center| 11–4
| Nah-Shon Burrell
| Decision (split)
| Strikeforce: Rockhold vs. Jardine
| 
| align=center| 3
| align=center| 5:00
| Las Vegas, Nevada, United States
| 
|-
| Win
| align=center| 11–3
| Magno Almeida
| KO (punches)
| Strikeforce Challengers: Larkin vs. Rossborough
| 
| align=center| 1
| align=center| 3:21
| Las Vegas, Nevada, United States
| 
|-
| Loss
| align=center| 10–3
| Caros Fodor
| Decision (unanimous)
| Strikeforce Challengers: Fodor vs. Terry
| 
| align=center| 3
| align=center| 5:00
| Kent, Washington, United States
| 
|-
| Win
| align=center| 10–2
| Josh Thornburg
| KO (punch)
| Strikeforce Challengers: Wilcox vs. Damm
| 
| align=center| 1
| align=center| 4:38
| Stockton, California, United States
| 
|-
| Win
| align=center| 9–2
| Lucas Gamaza
| TKO (punches)
| Strikeforce: Diaz vs. Cyborg
| 
| align=center| 1
| align=center| 3:26
| San Jose, California, United States
| 
|-
| Win
| align=center| 8–2
| David Marshall
| Decision (unanimous)
| Strikeforce: Diaz vs. Noons II
| 
| align=center| 3
| align=center| 5:00
| San Jose, California, United States
| 
|-
| Loss
| align=center| 7–2
| Tarec Saffiedine
| Decision (unanimous)
| Strikeforce Challengers: Kaufman vs. Hashi
| 
| align=center| 3
| align=center| 5:00
| San Jose, California, United States
| 
|-
| Win
| align=center| 7–1
| Zak Bucia
| TKO (head kick and punches)
| Strikeforce: Carano vs. Cyborg
| 
| align=center| 1
| align=center| 1:23
| San Jose, California, United States
| 
|-
| Win
| align=center| 6–1
| Zak Bucia
| Decision (unanimous)
| Strikeforce: Shamrock vs. Diaz
| 
| align=center| 3
| align=center| 5:00
| San Jose, California, United States
| 
|-
| Loss
| align=center| 5–1
| Jeremiah Metcalf
| Submission (rear-naked choke)
| CCFC: Mayhem
| 
| align=center| 2
| align=center| 1:47
| Santa Rosa, California, United States
| 
|-
| Win
| align=center| 5–0
| Josh Hinkle
| Decision (split)
| CCFC: Undefeated
| 
| align=center| 3
| align=center| 5:00
| Santa Rosa, California, United States
| 
|-
| Win
| align=center| 4–0
| Jack Montgomery
| Decision (unanimous)
| CCFC: Total Elimination
| 
| align=center| 3
| align=center| 5:00
| Santa Rosa, California, United States
| 
|-
| Win
| align=center| 3–0
| Tony Juarez
| TKO (corner stoppage)
| CCFC: Judgment Day
| 
| align=center| 1
| align=center| 2:10
| Santa Rosa, California, United States
| 
|-
| Win
| align=center| 2–0
| Josh McDonald
| Decision (unanimous)
| CCFC: Throwdown at The Pavilion
| 
| align=center| 3
| align=center| 5:00
| Santa Rosa, California, United States
| 
|-
| Win
| align=center| 1–0
| Josh Hayes
| Decision (unanimous)
| Warrior Cup 1
| 
| align=center| 3
| align=center| 5:00
| Stockton, California, United States
|

See also
 List of current Bellator fighters

References

External links
 

American male mixed martial artists
Welterweight mixed martial artists
Mixed martial artists from Alaska
Mixed martial artists utilizing collegiate wrestling
American male sport wrestlers
Amateur wrestlers
Living people
1981 births